The 1916 Washington State football team was an American football team that represented Washington State College during the 1916 college football season. The team competed as an independent under head coach William Dietz, compiling a record of 4–2, and played home games on campus at Rogers Field in Pullman, Washington. 

Washington State joined the Pacific Coast Conference the following season, the PCC's second season.

Schedule

References

External links
Official game program: Idaho at Washington State – November 4, 1916

Washington State
Washington State Cougars football seasons
Washington State football